José Luis Sierra may refer to the following Chilean footballers:

José Luis Sierra (footballer, born 1968)
José Luis Sierra (footballer, born 1997)